The 2020 Samford Bulldogs football team represented Samford University in the 2020–21 NCAA Division I FCS football season. They were led by sixth-year head coach Chris Hatcher and played their home games at Seibert Stadium. They played as a member of the Southern Conference (SoCon).

Schedule
Samford had a game scheduled against Florida State, which was canceled due to the COVID-19 pandemic.

Notes

References

Samford
Samford Bulldogs football seasons
Samford Bulldogs football